Joseph A. Bulbulia is a Professor of Psychology in the Faculty of Science at Victoria University of Wellington (2020-present). He was the Maclaurin Goodfellow Chair in the School of Humanities, Faculty of Arts at University of Auckland (2018-2020). He previously served as a Professor in the School of Art History, Classics and Religious Studies at Victoria University of Wellington (2000– 2017). Bulbulia is regarded as one of the founders of the contemporary evolutionary religious studies . He is a past president of the International Association for the Cognitive Science of Religion and is currently co-editor of Religion, Brain & Behavior. Bulbulia is one of four on the Senior Management Team of the New Zealand Attitudes and Values Study, a 20-year longitudinal study tracking over 15,000 New Zealanders each year. He is an associate investigator for Pulotu, a database of 116 Pacific cultures purpose-built to investigate the evolutionary dynamics of religion. In 2016 Bulbulia won a Research Excellence Award at Victoria University.

Career 
Bulbulia's early work explained how features of religious beliefs and emotions make people more predictably cooperative with members of their group, and uncooperative with people regarded to be social threats. Later work quantified the effects of religion on social responses to test functional theories of religion.

Life 
Bulbulia was born in Buffalo, New York. He received his PhD from Princeton University in 2001.

Awards and achievements 

 2016 Victoria University Research Excellence Award
 2015 Co-editor, Religion Brain & Behavior
 2014 President: International Association for the Cognitive Science of Religion
 2013 Editorial Advisory Board: Zygon: Journal of Religion and Science
 2011 Editorial Advisory Board: Journal of the Cognitive Science of Religion
 2010-2012 Secretary General: International Association for the Cognitive Science of Religion
 2010-2014 Editorial Advisory Board: Religion, Brain & Behavior 
 2010-2012 Advisor: The Adaptive Logic of Religious Belief and Behaviour Group
 2006 Distinguished Fellow: Religion Cognition and Culture Group, Aarhus University
 2006-2010 Executive Committee: International Association for the Cognitive Science of Religion
 2006 Gæsteprofessor: Religion, Cognition, Culture Group: Aarhus University
 2000 Faculty Fellowship, Stevenson Hall: Princeton University
 1996-1999 Assistant Master, Stevenson Hall: Princeton University
 1996 Melon Fellowship: Princeton University
 1996 Bowen Merit Award: Princeton University

Peer-reviewed publications 
 
 
 
 
 
 
 Bulbulia, J. A., Shaver, J., Greaves, L., Sosis, R., and Sibley, C. G. (2015). Religion and parental cooperation: an empirical test of Slone's sexual signaling model. In Slone, D. and Van Slyke, J., editors, The Attraction of Religion: A Sexual Se-lectionist Account, chapter 2, pages 29–62. Bloomsbury Press. article

References

External links 
 
 Joseph Bulbulia - School of Humanities, Faculty of Arts - University of Auckland

1968 births
Living people
People from Buffalo, New York
Harvard Divinity School alumni
Princeton University alumni
Academic staff of the Victoria University of Wellington